In the U.S. state of Oregon, there are two systems for categorizing roads in the state highway system: named state highways and numbered state routes.  Named highways, such as the Pacific Highway No. 1 or the North Umpqua Highway East No. 138, are primarily used internally by the Oregon Department of Transportation (ODOT) whereas numbered routes, such as Interstate 5 (I-5), U.S. Highway 20 (US 20), or Oregon Route 140 (OR 140), are posted on road signs and route markers.  The two systems overlap significantly, but the route numbers are not necessarily coterminous with highway names and some routes may comprise several highways. For example, OR 47 is overlaid on the Mist–Clatskanie Highway No. 110, Nehalem Highway No. 102, and Tualatin Valley Highway No. 29.  In addition to OR 47, the Tualatin Valley Highway No. 29 also comprises part of OR 8.

The primary state highway system was designated in 1917 with 36 highways, some of which were designated by the Oregon State Legislature and the rest were added by the Oregon State Highway Commission.  Starting in 1931, the highway commission took over maintenance of several county "market roads" that became the secondary state highway system.  State highways have a route number that is used internally by ODOT; primary highways have a one- or two-digit route number (i.e., the Columbia River Highway No. 2 or the Pendleton–John Day Highway No. 28) and secondary highways have a three digit route number (i.e., the Jefferson Highway No. 164).  Secondary highways are numbered by county; each county has a range of ten numbers.  For instance, Highways 330 to 339 are in Umatilla County.


List of state highways

References

 
State highways
State highways in Oregon